Events from the year 1637 in Sweden

Incumbents
 Monarch – Christina

Events

 The first regulation of the Romani, Placat om Tatrarnes fördrifvande av landet, declare all Romani expelled from Sweden: all adult men are sentenced to death while women and children are to be hunted over the borders.  
 Gese Wechel becomes the first female manager of the Swedish Post Office.

Births

 Axel Julius De la Gardie, field marshal and governor general  (died 1710) 
 Beata Elisabet von Königsmarck, countess and landowner  (died 1723)

Deaths

References

 
Years of the 17th century in Sweden
Sweden